Trude Gundersen (born 6 June 1977 in Bergen) is a retired Norwegian taekwondo athlete. She was Norway's first and only taekwondo competitor during the 2000 Summer Olympics in Sydney, and won a silver medal in the -67 kg weight class.

After the 2000 Summer Olympics she tried to continue the hard training in combination with her ambition to become a doctor. But in 2002 she quit professional taekwondo and focused instead on her medical studies.

References

External links
 

1977 births
Living people
Norwegian female taekwondo practitioners
Olympic taekwondo practitioners of Norway
Taekwondo practitioners at the 2000 Summer Olympics
Olympic medalists in taekwondo

Medalists at the 2000 Summer Olympics
Olympic silver medalists for Norway
Sportspeople from Bergen
21st-century Norwegian women